Frank Rudolph Paul (April 18, 1884 – June 29, 1963) was an American illustrator of pulp magazines in the science fiction field.

A discovery of editor Hugo Gernsback, Paul was influential in defining the look of both cover art and interior illustrations in the nascent science fiction pulps of the 1920s.

The Science Fiction Hall of Fame inducted him in 2009.

Biography
Paul was born on April 18, 1884 in Radkersburg, Austria-Hungary. His father was from Hungary and his mother from Czechoslovakia. He emigrated to the United States in 1906. He married Rudolpha Costa Rigelsen, a Belgian immigrant, in 1913, and they had four children, Robert S. Paul (born 1915), Francis L. Paul (born 1919), Joan C. Paul (born 1921), and Patricia Ann Paul (born 1929). He studied art in Vienna, Paris, and New York City. He went to work for the Jersey Journal performing graphic design. Publisher Hugo Gernsback hired him in 1914 to illustrate The Electrical Experimenter, a science magazine.

He died on June 29, 1963 at his home in Teaneck, New Jersey.

Work
Paul's work is characterized by dramatic compositions (often involving enormous machines, robots or spaceships), bright or even garish colors, and a limited ability to depict human faces, especially the female ones. His early architectural training is also evident in his work.

Paul illustrated the cover of Gernsback's own novel, Ralph 124C 41+: A Romance of the Year 2660 (The Stratford Company, 1925), originally a 1911–1912 serial. He painted 38 covers for Amazing Stories from April 1926 to June 1929 and seven for the Amazing Stories Annual and Quarterly; with several dozen additional issues featuring his art on the back cover (May 1939 to July 1946), and several issues from April 1961 to September 1968 featuring new or reproduced art. After Gernsback lost control of Amazing Stories in 1929, Paul followed him to the Wonder Stories magazines and associated quarterlies, which published 103 of his color covers from June 1929 to April 1936. Paul also painted covers for Planet Stories, Superworld Comics, Science Fiction magazine, and the first issue (October–November 1939) of Marvel Comics. The latter featured the debuts of Human Torch and Sub-Mariner, and good copies sell at auction for twenty to thirty thousand dollars. All told, his magazine covers exceed 220.

His most famous Amazing Stories cover is probably that for August 1927 (see image), illustrating The War of the Worlds by H. G. Wells, whose serial reprint began in that number.

Paul created hundreds of interior illustrations from no later than 1920.

Influence on the genre
In many ways, Frank R. Paul's achievements and influence on the field through the ages cannot be overestimated. His work appeared on the cover of the first issue (April 1926) of Amazing Stories magazine, the first magazine dedicated to science fiction. He would paint all the covers for over three years. These visions of robots, spaceships, and aliens were presented to an America wherein most people did not even have a telephone. Indeed, they were the first science fiction images seen by Ray Bradbury, Arthur C. Clarke, Forrest J Ackerman and others who would go on to great prominence in the field.

Paul's emphasis on concept, action and milieu over human figures was to continue to be a defining genre signal of SF art even when executed by successors with greater technical skill and more depth of artistic vision. The visual language of the majority of SF art centers, even today, are more sophisticated versions of Paul's central tropes. 

The Frank R Paul Award, named in his honor, was awarded by the Nashville Science Fiction Association from 1976 to 1996 to such distinguished artists as Frank Kelly Freas, Alex Schomburg and Victoria Poyser.

Firsts

Frank R. Paul can be credited with the first color painting of a space station (August 1929, Science Wonder Stories) published in the U.S.  His cover for the November 1929 Science Wonder Stories was an early, if not the earliest, depiction of a flying saucer.  This painting appeared almost two decades before the sightings of mysterious flying objects by Kenneth Arnold. So large was his stature that he was the only guest of honor at the first World Science Fiction Convention in 1939. He has been described as the first person to make a living drawing spaceships; this is a slight exaggeration, as much of his income was also derived from technical drawing. He was also the cover artist of Marvel Comics #1 (Oct. 1939), the first ever Marvel Comic and became well known for his work.

He was very innovative in the depiction of spaceships. Several of his illustrations were disc shaped and it has been speculated that he may have, accidentally, created the UFO craze when the first sighting of lights in the sky were described as disc shaped; this would have been the result of the psychological phenomenon known as mental set.

References

External links

 
 
 
 Frank R. Paul Gallery
 Sci-fi Scanner
  Collections of Frank R. Paul

1884 births
1963 deaths
American illustrators
American speculative fiction artists
Austrian speculative fiction artists
Austro-Hungarian emigrants to the United States
People from Bad Radkersburg
People from Teaneck, New Jersey
People from the Duchy of Styria
Pulp fiction artists
Science fiction artists
Science Fiction Hall of Fame inductees